Early parliamentary elections were held in the Kingdom of Croatia-Slavonia on 27 and 28 February 1908, after being called by Ban Pavao Rauch.

Results

Elected representatives

References

Elections in Croatia
Croatia
1908 in Croatia
Elections in Austria-Hungary
February 1908 events
Kingdom of Croatia-Slavonia
Election and referendum articles with incomplete results